The Belleair Causeway is a concrete girder bridge that crosses the Intracoastal Waterway, connecting the barrier islands of Belleair Beach and the mainland of Largo, Florida. The bridge carries West Bay Drive, part of CR 416, and was built in 2009, replacing a double-leaf bascule bridge built in 1950.

See also 
 Dunedin Causeway
 Clearwater Memorial Causeway
 Sand Key Bridge
 Indian Rocks Causeway
 Park Boulevard Bridge
 Tom Stuart Causeway
 John's Pass Bridge
 Treasure Island Causeway
 Corey Causeway
 Pinellas Bayway

References 

Concrete girder bridges
Bridges completed in 2010
Bridges completed in 1950
Causeways in Florida